is a closed railway station on the Kabe Line in Katsugi, Kabe-chō, Asakita-ku, Hiroshima, Hiroshima Prefecture, Japan, formerly operated by West Japan Railway Company (JR West). It closed on 1 December 2003 when operation of the line was discontinued/suspended between Kabe Station and Sandankyō Station.

History

13 October 1936: Aki-Kameyama Station opens
31 March 1955: After the merging of Ōbayashi, Kameyama and Miiri into Kabe-chō, the area around the station was renamed Katsugi, Kabe-chō, Asakita District, Hiroshima
1 April 1972: After Kabe-chō became part of Hiroshima City, the area around the station was renamed Katsugi, Kabe-chō, Hiroshima
1973: Aki-Kameyama Station becomes a Hiroshima City station
1 April 1980: After Hiroshima becomes a designated city, the area around the station is renamed Katsugi, Kabe-chō, Asakita-ku, Hiroshima
1 April 1987: Japanese National Railways is privatized, and Aki-Kameyama Station becomes a JR West station
1 December 2003: Aki-Kameyama Station closes along with the rest of the non-electrified section of the Kabe Line

Station building
Aki-Kameyama Station is located on the north side of Hiroshima Prefectural Route 268. The station is high above the road, and accessible by a long staircase, and the back of the station building has a sign visible from the roadway. It features one side platform capable of handling one line, and featuring an enclosed waiting area.  The station was unmanned before this section of the Kabe Line was closed.

Surrounding area
The Ōta River is approximately 25 meters to the south of Aki-Kameyama Station. Ōno Shrine is located about 200 km from the station, and a small general store is located 100m west.

Highway access
 Hiroshima Prefectural Route 177 (Shimosa Higashi Route)
 Hiroshima Prefectural Route 267 (Utsu-Kabe Route)
 Hiroshima Prefectural Route 268 (Katsugi-Yasufuruichi Route)

Connecting lines
This information is historical as all stations on this part of the Kabe Line are currently suspended from regular service.
Kabe Line
Imaida Station — Aki-Kameyama Station — Kegi Station

References

Kabe Line suspended stations
Stations of West Japan Railway Company in Hiroshima city
Railway stations closed in 2003
Railway stations in Japan opened in 1936